Dhaya is a 2002 Indian Tamil-language action drama film directed by Senthil Kumar and produced by Prakash Raj. It stars Prakash Raj, Meena, Lakshmi and Raghuvaran. The National Film Award—Special Jury Award for Best Actor was awarded for Raj for this movie. The film released on 14 February 2002 and received positive reviews from critics and audience.

Plot 
Dhaya (Prakash Raj) is a rowdy in Chennai with enough political clout to make the police look the other way when he indulges in his nefarious activities. Thulasi (Meena) moves into his neighbourhood, but all her attempts to reform him fail. Rudhraiya (Raghuvaran), an ex-army man who has a score to settle with Sharada Amma (Lakshmi), hires Dhaya to discredit her. Sharada Amma runs an orphanage for abandoned children and is a good woman who turns a deaf ear to Thulasi's warnings about Dhaya's real character. Dhaya earns Sharada Amma's trust and gets himself hired as her car driver, while secretly planning her downfall.

Cast

Soundtrack

References 

2002 films
2000s Tamil-language films
Films scored by Bharadwaj (composer)